Players and pairs who neither have high enough rankings nor receive wild cards may participate in a qualifying tournament held one week before the annual Wimbledon Tennis Championships.

Seeds
The top 6 seeds received a bye into the second round.

  Scott Draper (qualifying competition, lucky loser)
  Wally Masur (qualified)
  Henrik Holm (second round)
  Arne Thoms (qualified)
  Christian Bergström (qualified)
  Lars Burgsmüller (qualified)
  Patrick Baur (qualified)
  Laurence Tieleman (second round)
  Paul Kilderry (second round)
  Emilio Benfele Álvarez (qualifying competition, lucky loser)
  Lionel Barthez (qualifying competition,  Lucky loser)
  David Witt (second round)
  Steve Bryan (second round)
  Steve Campbell (first round)
  Jamie Morgan (qualified)
  Roger Smith (second round)
  Diego Nargiso (qualified)
  Kenny Thorne (first round)
  Daniel Nestor (qualified)
  Dick Norman (qualifying competition, lucky loser)
  David Adams (second round)
  Albert Chang (qualified)
  Mark Knowles (qualified)
  Louis Gloria (qualified)
  Gonzalo López-Fabero (first round)
  Neil Borwick (qualified)
  Kent Kinnear (first round)
  Gilad Bloom (first round)
  Nicolas Kiefer (second round)
  Grant Doyle (second round)
  Martijn Bok (first round)
  Simon Youl (first round)

Qualifiers

  Peter Tramacchi
  Wally Masur
  Andrew Painter
  Arne Thoms
  Christian Bergström
  Lars Burgsmüller
  Patrick Baur
  Neil Borwick
  Mark Knowles
  Louis Gloria
  Albert Chang
  Ken Flach
  Sandon Stolle
  Daniel Nestor
  Jamie Morgan
  Diego Nargiso

Lucky losers

  Scott Draper
  Stéphane Simian
  Emilio Benfele Álvarez
  Lionel Barthez
  Dick Norman
  Eyal Erlich

Qualifying draw

First qualifier

Second qualifier

Third qualifier

Fourth qualifier

Fifth qualifier

Sixth qualifier

Seventh qualifier

Eighth qualifier

Ninth qualifier

Tenth qualifier

Eleventh qualifier

Twelfth qualifier

Thirteenth qualifier

Fourteenth qualifier

Fifteenth qualifier

Sixteenth qualifier

External links

 1995 Wimbledon Championships – Men's draws and results at the International Tennis Federation

Men's Singles Qualifying
1995